Laphassaporn Tawoncharoen (formerly Jutamass Thavoncharoen, born 21 December 1981 in Bangkok) is a track and field sprint athlete who competes internationally for Thailand.

Biography
Thavoncharoen represented Thailand at the 2008 Summer Olympics in Beijing. She competed at the 100 metres sprint and placed sixth in her heat without advancing to the second round. She ran the distance in a time of 11.82 seconds. Together with Sangwan Jaksunin, Orranut Klomdee and Nongnuch Sanrat she also took part in the 4x100 metres relay. In their first round heat they placed fifth in a time of 44.38 seconds was the eleventh time overall out of sixteen participating nations. With this result they failed to qualify  for the final.

Achievements

References

External links
 
 
 

1981 births
Living people
Laphassaporn Tawoncharoen
Laphassaporn Tawoncharoen
Athletes (track and field) at the 2008 Summer Olympics
Laphassaporn Tawoncharoen
Asian Games medalists in athletics (track and field)
Athletes (track and field) at the 2002 Asian Games
Athletes (track and field) at the 2006 Asian Games
Athletes (track and field) at the 2010 Asian Games
Universiade medalists in athletics (track and field)
Laphassaporn Tawoncharoen
Laphassaporn Tawoncharoen
Southeast Asian Games medalists in athletics
Laphassaporn Tawoncharoen
Laphassaporn Tawoncharoen
Laphassaporn Tawoncharoen
Medalists at the 2002 Asian Games
Medalists at the 2010 Asian Games
Competitors at the 2003 Southeast Asian Games
Competitors at the 2005 Southeast Asian Games
Competitors at the 2009 Southeast Asian Games
Competitors at the 2011 Southeast Asian Games
Laphassaporn Tawoncharoen
Competitors at the 2009 Summer Universiade
Medalists at the 2007 Summer Universiade
Laphassaporn Tawoncharoen
Laphassaporn Tawoncharoen